Simone Russini (born 20 March 1996) is an Italian footballer who plays for  club Padova.

Club career
Born in Naples, Campania, Russini started his career at Amici di Mugnano youth academy.

Ternana
Russini joined Umbrian side Ternana in 2011, along with Antonio Palumbo. Russini was the top-scorer for their under-17 team in 2012–13 season, despite few goals behind the league topscorer. The team finished as the fifth of Group C, failing to qualify to the playoffs.

Juventus
On 10 July 2013 half of the registration rights of Russini was signed by Serie A giant Juventus for €650,000, as part of Alberto Masi's deal to Ternana, for €2 million. Russini signed a three-year contract. He was immediately loaned back to Ternana, which was extended in 2014–15 season. Russini left Juventus on 25 June 2015 without any appearance.

Ternana (loan)
Despite a player for their under-19 team, Russini also received no.27 shirt from the first team of Ternana Calcio. Russini was a player for the first team in 2013 pre-season friendly. In June 2014 the co-ownerships of Masi and Russini were renewed. Russini also returned to Ternana for 2014–15 Serie B season.

Paganese (loan)
On 2 February 2015 Russini joined Lega Pro club Paganese on a temporary deal.

Ternana return
In June 2015 Juventus sold Russini back to Ternana for €150,000 (reduced €500,000). Ternana also acquired Masi outright for €1.5 million (also discounted €500,000) on 2 February, using the transfer fee from selling Alberto Brignoli to Juventus for €1.75 million on the same day.

On 31 August 2015 Russini was signed by the third-tier side Lumezzane on a temporary deal.

Alessandria
On 31 August 2016 Russini was signed by Alessandria on a 3-year contract. He was immediately farmed to fellow Lega Pro club Lumezzane. Russini returned to Alessandria and was assigned number 20 shirt on 1 September 2017.

Siracusa
On 1 November 2018, he signed with Siracusa.

Cesena
On 7 July 2019, he joined Cesena on a two-year contract.

Catania
On 21 July 2021, he signed with Catania on a two-year contract.

On 9 April 2022, he was released together with all of his Catania teammates following the club's exclusion from Italian football due to its inability to overcome a number of financial issues.

Padova
On 5 July 2022, Russini joined Padova on a two-year contract.

Personal life
On 29 January 2021 he tested positive for COVID-19.

References

External links
 
 

1996 births
Footballers from Naples
Living people
Italian footballers
Association football forwards
Paganese Calcio 1926 players
Ternana Calcio players
F.C. Lumezzane V.G.Z. A.S.D. players
U.S. Alessandria Calcio 1912 players
Cesena F.C. players
Catania S.S.D. players
Calcio Padova players
Serie C players